North Cemetery may refer to:

 Manila North Cemetery, Philippines
 North Cemetery (Leverett, Massachusetts), United States
 North Cemetery (Worthington, Massachusetts), United States
 North Graveyard, also known as the North Cemetery, in Columbus, Ohio

See also
 Old North Cemetery (disambiguation)